Ke'Montae Tayvon "Tae" Hayes (born August 19, 1997) is an American football cornerback who is a free agent. He played college football for Appalachian State.

Professional career

Jacksonville Jaguars
Hayes signed with the Jacksonville Jaguars as an undrafted free agent but was released before the start of the 2019 season. He was later signed to the practice squad before being promoted to the active roster to replace injured wide receiver Marqise Lee. He was waived on December 12, 2019.

Miami Dolphins
On December 13, 2019, Hayes was claimed off waivers by the Miami Dolphins.

On September 5, 2020, Hayes was waived by the Dolphins and signed to the practice squad two days later. He was elevated to the active roster on September 24 and October 31 for the team's weeks 3 and 8 games against the Jacksonville Jaguars and Los Angeles Rams, and reverted to the practice squad after each game. He was released on November 23, 2020.

Minnesota Vikings
On December 2, 2020, Hayes signed with the practice squad of the Minnesota Vikings. He was elevated to the active roster on January 2, 2021, for the team's week 17 game against the Detroit Lions, and reverted to the practice squad after the game. He signed a reserve/future contract with the Vikings on January 4, 2021. On March 5, 2021, he was waived by the Vikings.

Arizona Cardinals
On May 17, 2021, Hayes signed with the Arizona Cardinals. He was waived on August 5, 2021.

Carolina Panthers
On December 30, 2021, Hayes was signed to the Carolina Panthers practice squad.

Birmingham Stallions
Hayes was selected with second pick of the ninth round of the 2022 USFL Draft by the Birmingham Stallions.

Carolina Panthers (second stint)
On August 4, 2022, Hayes signed with the Carolina Panthers. He was waived on August 30, 2022 and signed to the practice squad the next day. He was promoted to the active roster on October 25. He was waived on December 10 and re-signed to the practice squad. He was released on December 20.

New England Patriots
On December 27, 2022, Hayes was signed to the New England Patriots practice squad. He was promoted to the active roster four days later. On January 6, 2023, Hayes signed a two year contract with New England. He was waived on February 15, 2023.

References

External links
Appalachian State bio

1997 births
Living people
Sportspeople from Decatur, Alabama
Players of American football from Alabama
American football cornerbacks
Appalachian State Mountaineers football players
Jacksonville Jaguars players
Miami Dolphins players
Minnesota Vikings players
Arizona Cardinals players
Carolina Panthers players
Birmingham Stallions (2022) players
New England Patriots players